Laodicea Combusta (Laodikeia Katakekaumenê, "Laodicea the Burned") or Laodicea, and later known as Claudiolaodicea, was a Hellenistic city in central Anatolia, in the region of Pisidia; its site is currently occupied by Ladik, Sarayönü, Konya Province, in Central Anatolia, Turkey.

Laodicea was one of the five cities built by Seleucus I Nicator and named after his mother Laodice. Its surname is derived by Strabo (from the volcanic nature of the surrounding country), but Hamilton asserts that there is not a particle of volcanic or igneous rock in the neighbourhood, and it may be added that, if such were the case, the town would rather have been called, in Greek, Laodikeia tês katakekaumenês. The most probable solution undoubtedly is that the town was at one time destroyed by fire, and that on being rebuilt it received the distinguishing surname. It was situated to the northwest of Iconium (now Konya), on the high road leading from the west coast to Melitene on the Euphrates. Some ancient authors describe it as situated in Lycaonia and others as a town of Pisidia, and Ptolemy places it in Galatia, but this discrepancy is easily explained by recollecting that the territories just mentioned were often extended or reduced in extent, so that at one time the town belonged to Lycaonia, while at another it formed part of Pisidia. Its foundation is not mentioned by any ancient writer.

Laodicea is at Ladik, and numerous fragments of ancient architecture and sculpture have been found. Visitors in the 19th century described seeing inscribed marbles, altars, columns, capitals, friezes, and cornices dispersed throughout the streets and among the houses and burying grounds. From this it would appear that Laodicea must once have been a very considerable town. It was restored by Claudius and received the name Claudiolaodicea. There are a few imperial coins of Laodicea, belonging to the reigns of Titus and Domitian.

See also 
 List of ancient Greek cities

Notes

References
Richard Talbert, Barrington Atlas of the Greek and Roman World, p. 63.

External links
Hazlitt, Classical Gazetteer, "Laodicea"
Smith, William (editor); Dictionary of Greek and Roman Geography, "Laodiceia", London, (1854)

Archaeological sites in Central Anatolia
Ancient Greek archaeological sites in Turkey
Seleucid colonies in Anatolia
Populated places in ancient Lycaonia
Hellenistic Phrygia
Populated places in Pisidia
Populated places in Phrygia
Roman towns and cities in Turkey
Former populated places in Turkey
Geography of Konya Province
Populated places of the Byzantine Empire